Ingelheim, officially Ingelheim am Rhein, is a town in the Mainz-Bingen district in the Rhineland-Palatinate state of Germany. The town sprawls along the Rhine's west bank. It has been Mainz-Bingen's district seat since 1996.

From the later half of the 8th century, the Ingelheim Imperial Palace, which served emperors and kings as a lodging and a ruling seat until the 11th century, was to be found here.

Etymology 
The typically Rhenish-Hessian placename ending —heim might well go back to Frankish times, that is to say, likely as far back as the 5th or 6th century. Settlements or estates then took their lords’ names and were given this suffix, which means "home" in German. The name is recorded in later documents as Ingilinhaim, Ingilinheim (782), Ingilenhaim, Engelheim, Hengilonheim, Engilonheim (822), Engilinheim (826), Hingilinheim (855), Ingilunheim (874), Ingulinheim (889), Ingelesheim (891), Ingelenheim (940), Anglia sedes (1051), Ingilheim and Ingelnheim (1286), among other forms.

Since 1269, a distinction has been made between Nieder-Ingelheim and Ober-Ingelheim (Lower and Upper Ingelheim).

Geography

Location 
Ingelheim am Rhein lies in the north of Rhein Hessen on the so-called Rhein Knee, west of the state capital, Mainz. The Rhein forms the town's northern limit. Southwards, the town stretches into the valley of the river Selz, which empties into the Rhein in the constituent community of Frei-Weinheim or Ingelheim-Nord ("North").

The constituent communities of Ingelheim-Mitte and Ingelheim-Süd ("Middle" and "South") are nestled against the corner of the so-called  ("Mainz Mountain").

The municipal area's lowest point is the harbour on the Rhein at 80.8 m above sea level.

An obelisk on the south side of the village in direction Wackernheim, marks the road begun by Charlemagne, and completed by Napoleon. From this point a fine prospect of the entire Rheingau could be obtained.

Municipal area’s extent 
The municipal area's north-south extent is 7.9 km, while the east-west extent is 5 km.

Neighbouring municipalities 
Clockwise from the north, these are Geisenheim, Oestrich-Winkel on the Rhine's right bank, and on the left bank Budenheim, Finthen, the Verbandsgemeinde of Nieder-Olm, Schwabenheim, Gau-Algesheim (both belonging to the Verbandsgemeinde of Gau-Algesheim) and Bingen am Rhein. Since 1 July 2019 Wackernheim and Heidesheim are incorporated into the city of Ingelheim.

Constituent communities 
Ingelheim is currently divided into six Stadtteile: Ingelheim-Mitte, Ingelheim-Nord, Ingelheim-Süd, Sporkenheim, Groß-Winternheim and Ingelheim-West. Before Ingelheim became a town in 1939, the first three centres bore the names Nieder-Ingelheim, Frei-Weinheim and Ober-Ingelheim. Official changes notwithstanding, the old names are still quite often used.

Climate 
The town lies in the temperate zone. The average yearly temperature in Ingelheim is 9.8 °C. The warmest months are July and August with average temperatures of 18.0 and 18.5 °C respectively, and the coldest month is January at 1.0 °C on average. The most precipitation falls in June and August with an average of 64 mm, and the least in March with an average of 31 mm. Like all Rhenish Hesse, Ingelheim, too, is sheltered from the weather by the Hunsrück, the Taunus, the Odenwald and the Donnersberg, thereby limiting the yearly precipitation to only 560 mm.

History 
The Ingelheim area was already settled in prehistoric times. The place first earned itself particular importance, though, only under Charlemagne and his successors. Charlemagne had built the Ingelheim Imperial Palace (Ingelheimer Kaiserpfalz) here, where synods and Imperial diets were held in the time that followed. His son and successor, Emperor Louis the Pious, died on 20 June 840 in Ingelheim.

In the High and Late Middle Ages, the Palatinate's, and thereby also Ingelheim's, importance shrank.

For German justice history, the Ingelheimer Oberhof ("Ingelheim Upper Court") is of particular importance, as a unique collection of judgments from the 15th and 16th centuries that it handed down has been preserved.

Late 19th century Ingelheim was the residence of the Dutch writer Multatuli (Eduard Douwes Dekker).

In 1939, the formerly self-administering municipalities of Nieder-Ingelheim, Ober-Ingelheim and Frei-Weinheim were merged into the Town of Ingelheim am Rhein.

From the Second World War, Ingelheim emerged as the only unscathed town between Mainz and Koblenz. Today, Ingelheim is a middle centre in Rhineland-Palatinate, a Great District-Bound Town (Große kreisangehörige Stadt – a status deriving from the Rhineland-Palatinate Municipal Order) and the seat of district administration for Mainz-Bingen.

Furthermore, Ingelheim harbours the business Boehringer Ingelheim which is active worldwide.

Population data

Religion 
In 2004, 36% of Ingelheim's inhabitants belonged to the Lutheran faith, and 34% were Catholic, while 24% were without any religious faith; from 2% of the population, no data were forthcoming.

The six Catholic parishes belong, within the Roman Catholic Diocese of Mainz to the Deanery of Bingen.

The five Protestant parishes of the EKHN belong to the Provostship (Propstei) of Mainz, and within this to the Deanery of Ingelheim.

Besides these, the Baptists, Religious humanists and Muslims each have small communities in Ingelheim, as do the Jehovah's Witnesses and Buddhists.

Until 1942 there was a Jewish community, whose beginnings went back to the 16th century. About 1850, roughly 200 Jewish inhabitants lived in Ober-Ingelheim, and by 1933 there were still 134 all together in Oberingelheim and Niederingelheim. In 1840 and 1841, a synagogue that was important to architectural history was built. It was dedicated on 27 August 1841 and destroyed on 9 November 1938 – Kristallnacht. Many Jewish inhabitants lost their lives after being deported to the death camps during the time of the Third Reich.

Amalgamations 
On 22 April 1972 the municipality of Groß-Winternheim was amalgamated. The former municipalities Heidesheim am Rhein and Wackernheim were merged into Ingelheim am Rhein on 1 July 2019.

Population development

Before 1939

Beginning in 1939

Politics

Town council 
The municipal election held in 2004 yielded the following results:

Mayor 

In the last mayoral elections, held on 26 May 2019, Ralf Claus, mayor of Ingelheim since 2012, was reelected as mayor:

Results of council elections since 1946 
1946
 CDU: 42.2%
 SPD: 26%
 KPD: 9.2%
 Liste Gemünden/Gaul: 22.6%
 Eligible voters: 6,899
 Voter turnout: 88.6%

1948
 CDU: 35.1%
 SPD: 33.1%
 DP: 25.3%
 KP: 6.5%
 9 November 1952
 Freie Bürgerliste Rausch: 40.1%, 2,882 votes — 11 seats
 SPD: 23.04%, 1,656 votes — 6 seats
 CDU: 22.43%, 1,612 votes — 6 seats
 FDP: 10.21%, 734 votes — 2 seats
 KPD: 4.2%, 303 votes
 Eligible voters: 9,488
 Voter turnout: 77.76%, 7378 votes, 7,187 valid votes

 1956
 SPD: 36.79%, 2,611 votes — 9 seats
 CDU: 27.06%, 1,920 votes — 7 seats
 Wählergruppe Bambach: 24.45%, 1,735 votes — 6 seats
 FDP: 11.7%, 830 votes — 3 seats
 Eligible voters: 9,979
 Voter turnout: 72.62%, 7,247 votes, 7,096 valid votes

23 October 1960
 SPD: 42.61%, 3,114 votes — 11 seats
 CDU: 36.65%, 2,679 votes — 10 seats
 FDP: 16.92%, 1,237 votes — 2 seats
 Wählergruppe Kaufmann: 3.82%, 279 votes
 Eligible voters: 10,695
 Voter turnout: 70.14%, 7,502 votes, 7,309 valid votes

25 October 1964
 SPD: 51.7% — 13 seats (absolute majority)
 CDU: 34.7%, 2,800 votes — 9 seats
 FDP: 13.6%, 1,098 votes — 3 seats
 Eligible voters: 11,369 (50a CDU) 11,312 (40a Ing)
 Voter turnout: 72.77%, 8,231 votes (50a CDU) 8,232 (40a Ing)

8 June 1969
 CDU: 37.15%, 3,397 votes — 12 seats
 SPD: 34.45%, 3,150 votes — 11 seats
 FDP: 10.45%, 956 votes — 3 seats
 Freie Wählergruppe Kaege: 17.95%, 1,641 votes — 5 seats
 Eligible voters: 12,295
 Voter turnout: 75.51%, 9,309 votes, 9,144 valid votes

23 April 1972
 SPD: 41.99%, 4,263 votes — 14 seats (according to 40a 4,264)
 CDU: 38.92%, 3,952 votes — 12 seats
 FDP: 8.79%, 892 votes — 2 seats
 Wählergruppe Kaege: 10.28%, 1,044 votes — 3 seats
 Eligible voters: 13,992
 Voter turnout: 73.46%, 10,280 votes, 10,153 valid votes

17 March 1974
 CDU: 46.6%, 5,092 votes — 17 seats (40a: 46.40%)
 SPD: 34.34%, 3,769 votes — 12 seats
 FDP: 10.26%, 1,126 votes — 3 seats
 FWG: 8.98%, 986 votes — 3 seats
 Eligible voters: 14,027
 Voter turnout: 79.17%, 11,106 votes, 10,973 valid votes

10/11 June 1979
 SPD: 42.12%, 4,322 votes — 14 seats
 CDU: 41.52%, 4,261 votes — 13 seats
 FDP: 8.21%, 842 votes — 2 seats
 FWG: 8.15%, 837 votes — 2 seats
 Eligible voters: 14,238
 Voter turnout: 73.54%, 10,470 votes, 10,262 valid votes

17 June 1984
 CDU: 40.7%, 4,576 votes — 15 seats
 SPD: 44.1%, 4,966 votes — 16 seats
 FDP: 7.8% — 2 seats
 FWG: 10.6% — 2 seats
 DKP: 1% — 112 votes
 Eligible voters: 15,408
 Voter turnout: 74.9%, 11,252 valid votes

18 June 1989
 SPD: 41.0% — 15 seats
 CDU: 31.2% — 11 seats
 FWG: 10.6% — 4 seats
 FDP: 7.75% — 3 seats
 Grüne: 7.38% — 2 seats
12 June 1994
 SPD: 36.6% — 13 seats
 CDU: 31.0% — 11 seats
 FWG: 6 seats
 Grüne: 4 seats
 FDP: 2 seats
 Voter turnout: 70%, 11,781 votes

Mayors before 1939 
Nieder-Ingelheim
 Weitzel about 1881
 Leonard Muntermann (DDP, 1912 - 7 April 1932)
Ober-Ingelheim
 Dr. Georg Rückert (February 1932 - April 1933)
 Gaul (1933-)

(Chief) Mayors since 1939 
Mayors (Bürgermeister) from 1946, Chief Mayors (Oberbürgermeister) from 1972:

 1939-1945: Franz Bambach (NSDAP)
 15 April 1945 - 23 June 1945: Georg Schick
 23 June 1945 - : Dr. iur. Georg Rückert (SP)
 22 September 1946 – 1948: Dr. iur. Georg Rückert (SP)
 1949 - 1 October 1956: Dr. rer. pol. Heinz Brühne (SPD)
 1957-1964: Heinz Kühn
 1964-1965: Albert Saalwächter
 1966-1972: Hans-Ulrich Oehlschlägel, BM (SPD)
 1972-1975: Hans-Ulrich Oehlschlägel, OB (SPD)
 1975-1995: Anno Vey (CDU)
 1995-2011: Dr. Joachim Gerhard (CDU)
 2011-    : Ralf Claus (SPD)

Coat of arms 
The town's arms might be described thus: Argent an eagle displayed sable armed and langued gules.

The eagle is the Imperial Eagle. The arms have their roots in the Imperial Freedom enjoyed by the Ingelheimer Grund (Ingelheim area).

Old coats of arms 

Nieder-Ingelheim: Argent a wall embattled gules masoned sable, issuant therefrom a demi-eagle displayed of the third beaked and langued of the second.

Ober-Ingelheim: Argent an eagle displayed sable armed, beaked and langued gules.

Sponsorships 
 Airbus Ingelheim am Rhein D-ABJE, Boeing 737-530, SN 25310/2126
 Until her decommissioning on 28 June 2001 there was a partnership with S58 Pinguin, a German Navy Fast Attack Craft.

Twin towns – sister cities

Ingelheim am Rhein is twinned with:

 Stevenage, England, United Kingdom (1963)
 Autun, France (1963)
 San Pietro in Cariano, Italy (1984)
 Friedrichshain-Kreuzberg (Berlin), Germany (1971)
 Limbach-Oberfrohna, Germany (1990)
 Nysa, Poland (2002)

On 24 October 1975, the three-way partnership between Ingelheim, Autun and Stevenage was officially sealed.

Culture and sightseeing

Ingelheimer Fassenacht 
There is in Ingelheim a well-developed carnival culture, which admittedly is very much under the Mainz carnival’s influence. All together, the town counts four Carnival clubs:
 Carneval-Verein "Wäschbächer" 1885
 Carnevalverein Frei-Weinheim
 Ingelheimer Carnevalverein
 Narrenclub Ingelheim 1987 ("Fools’ Club")

Museums 
The Museum bei der Kaiserpfalz ("Museum at the Imperial Palace") has an exhibit dedicated to the Imperial Palace built in Ingelheim after 785 by Charlemagne. On show are small archaeological finds, objects from architectural sculpture and a demonstrative model of the once imposing building. Remnants of the Imperial Palace can be seen right near the museum. Of Europe-wide importance is the golden solidus found in 1996, which is hitherto still the only gold coin ever found struck with Charlemagne's effigy.

Music 
 Further Education Centre Symphony Orchestra
 Ingelheimer Konfettis (performing and singing group)
 Ingelheim church choir
 Bläserchöre Ingelheim (wind choirs)
 Carolus Magnus-Ingelheimer Kaiserpfalzbläser (wind ensemble)
 Telemann-Chor Ingelheim (choir)

Singing clubs 
 GV Liederkranz 1857
 GV Einigkeit 1885
 GV Germania 1862
 MGV 1866
 Schubert-Quartett 1924 e.V.
 Boehringer Jazz & Pop Chor 2009

Buildings 
The town has at its disposal a range of historical buildings worth seeing:

Others 
 St. Michael with Plague Cross
 Carolingian aqueduct
 Heidesheimer Tor (gate)
 Bismarck Tower
 Ohrenbrücker Tor (gate)
 Jewish graveyard
 Old market hall in Nieder-Ingelheim

Parks 
 Kommerzienrat-Boehringer-Anlage
 Emmerlingscher Park
 Rosengärtchen
 Uffhubtor-Anlage

Natural monuments 

Drifting chalk sands and dunes
In the cadastral areas of Nieder-Ingelheim and Frei-Weinheim, mainly north of the Autobahn along Konrad-Adenauer-Straße, but also south of the Autobahn – even within the Boehringer Ingelheim industrial lands – are found drifting chalk sands. Likewise a deposit is to be found in the area of the Griesmühle (mill).

These formations are under conservational protection under the Rhineland-Palatinate State Care Law. Damaging them or removing them, among other acts, is considered an incompensable encroachment on nature and the landscape. Municipal building uses in drifting chalk sand areas are therefore routinely excluded or only approved in very special cases. Two such exceptions were the building of Konrad-Adenauer-Straße (from the Autobahn bridge to Rheinstraße) and the building of the daycare centre on Sporkenheimer Straße.

Sport 
 1. Schwimmsportverein Ingelheim 1966 e.V. (swimming)
 RV Ingelheim
 SpVgg Ingelheim
 TUS Ober-Ingelheim
 Turngemeinde 1847 Corp. Nieder-Ingelheim (gymnastics)
 SV Ingelheim 1949 e.V.
 VfL Frei Weinheim
 HSC Ingelheim
 TV Frei-Weinheim (gymnastics)
 MFG-Ingelheim e.V. - Modellfluggruppe Ingelheim e.V.
 TSC Ingelheim
 FSC Ingelheim 07

 Bridgeclub Ingelheim

Common welfare 
 Mütter- und FamilienZentrum e.V. MütZe
The MütZe ("Mothers’ and Families’ Centre", with the abbreviation resembling the word Mütze – "cap") is to be found at the old Gymnasium. The MütZe takes upon itself a generation-spanning exchange for all Ingelheim residents. A babysitter exchange, handicraft classes, breakfast and lunch, housework and holiday support are regularly offered, as well as courses and events covering every family theme from babies to health to creativity.

In Ingelheim there are also a House of Youth (Haus der Jugend, although this is soon to become a shopping centre and will be replaced with another House of Youth) and a Mehrgenerationshaus.

Regular events 
Since 1972 there has been a yearly folk music event, the Eurofolkfestival Ingelheim, on the Burgkirche Fairgrounds. It is said to be one of the successor festivals to the famous Waldeck-Festivals. A great number of the visitors are people from the hippie culture and youths from the local area and from throughout Germany. The number of visitors varies from 2,000 to 3,000. It is usually held between mid-June and mid-July and always lasts from Friday to Sunday. Out of the Eurofolkfestival grew the OpenOhr Festival (a youth cultural festival) in Mainz in 1974 and 1975.
 Hafenfest auf der Jungau ("Harbour Festival on the Jungau"), each year in early August.
 Ingelheimer Rotweinfest ("Ingelheim Red Wine Festival") on the Burgkirche Fairgrounds, is held each year from the last weekend in September to the first weekend in October.
 Kerb in Groß-Winternheim ("kermis, or church consecration festival"), second weekend in September
 Internationale Tage ("International Days"), each year since 1959. Organized for Boehringer Ingelheim by François Lachenal till 1997.till 2000 curated by Patricia Rochat and since then by Ulrich Luckhardt.
 Umsonst-und-drinnen, international music festival for new blood groups.
 Kinderfest der DPSG Ingelheim ("Ingelheim DPSG Children’s Festival"), each year on Ascension Day since 1969 on the Jungau in Frei-Weinheim.
 Entekerb ("Harvest Kermis"), in October in Frei-Weinheim.
 Altstadtfest ("Old Town Festival"), second weekend in August, staged by NCI
 Fest der Generationen, second Saturday in September around the old Gymnasium, staged by the MütZe

Culinary specialities 
Regional Rhenish-Hessian specialities are asparagus and morello cherries (a cultivar of sour cherries).

Economy and infrastructure

Transport 
The Autobahn A 60 runs through the municipal area and has two interchanges there. Bundesstraße 41 ends in Ingelheim. The Autobahnen A 61 and A 63 lie right nearby. Frankfurt Airport can be reached by Autobahn in roughly 30 minutes. Frankfurt-Hahn Airport can be reached in roughly 50 minutes by Autobahnen A 60 and A 61 or Bundesstraße 50.  A Bus to Hahn can be caught in Mainz

Ingelheim lies on the Mainz-Bingen-Cologne (West Rhine Railway) and Saarbrücken-Mainz-Frankfurt railway lines. Between Ingelheim-Nord and Oestrich-Winkel runs a Rhine ferry. The constituent communities and the surrounding municipalities are served by city and regional bus routes of Omnibusverkehr Rhein-Nahe GmbH. The local rail transport is served by the Rhein-Nahe-Nahverkehrsverbund.

Established businesses 
 Boehringer Ingelheim, pharmaceutical enterprise
 Envision Entertainment GmbH, formerly EA Phenomic, a video game developer
 Goldener Engel, brewery
 Karl Gemünden, building company
 Rheinhessische Energie- und Wasserversorgungs-GmbH, energy and water supply
 Vereinigte Obst- und Gemüsemärkte (VOG), Europe's biggest transshipment centre for sour cherries
 WetterKontor, supplier of weather information

Agricultural produce 
Of the 4,987-hectare municipal area, 641 ha is used for winegrowing and 1 373 ha is used for crops. The main agricultural produce is sour cherries, white asparagus and Wine. Although the town lies in a region dominated by white wine, 54.9% of the vineyard area in Ingelheim am Rhein is used for growing red wine varieties. With 641 ha in vineyards, the town is moreover one of Rhenish Hesse’s biggest winegrowing centres after Worms, (1,490 ha), Nierstein (783 ha), Alzey (769 ha), Westhofen (764 ha), Alsheim (704 ha) and Bechtheim (654 ha), and one of the biggest in the whole state of Rhineland-Palatinate.

"The red wines of Ingelheim and Heidesheim (…) opposite to Eltville (…) enjoy a high reputation."

The Geisenheim Grape Breeding Institute’s vegetable farming department runs an experimental asparagus field in Ingelheim. The research results can be viewed on the Internet.

Media 
Local daily newspaper: Allgemeine Zeitung Ingelheim within the Rhein Main Presse, published by the Verlagsgruppe Rhein Main, Mainz.

Municipal television: "Blickpunkt Ingelheim", which is broadcast every Monday and Thursday on regional channel K3.

Public institutions 
Since 1996, Ingelheim has been the seat of district administration for Mainz-Bingen.

Education 
Ingelheim is home to:

 three primary schools (Präsident-Mohr-Grundschule, Theodor-Heuss-Grundschule, Brüder-Grimm-Grundschule)
 a combination primary school and Hauptschule (Pestalozzi-Grund- u. Hauptschule)
 a professional college, die BBS Ingelheim
 a school for those with learning difficulties (Albert-Schweitzer-Sonderschule)
 a Realschule (Kaiserpfalz-Realschule)
 an integrated comprehensive school (Kurt Schumacher)
 a Gymnasium (Sebastian-Münster-Gymnasium)

Under the umbrella of the Ingelheim Further Education Centre Weiterbildungszentrum Ingelheim the following institutions work:
 Volkshochschule (folk high school)
 Fridtjof-Nansen-Akademie für politische Bildung (political education)
 Music school
 Jugendbildungswerk (youth education)

Notable people

Honorary citizens 
Robert Boehringer, entrepreneur and lyricist, named an honorary citizen of Ingelheim in 1974
Christian Rauch (1878–1976), archaeologist, named an honorary citizen of Ingelheim 16 December 1974

Sons and daughters of the town 

 Sebastian Münster (1488–1552), scientist (cosmographer, Hebraist)
 Johannes Anspach (1752–1823), pastelist, draftsman, painter, owner of an artist's studio in the Netherlands
 Klaus Knopper (born 1968), developer of Linux distribution Knoppix
 Markus Kreuz (born 1977), footballer

Other celebrities 
 Charlemagne, held court in Ingelheim in 807
 Louis the Pious, died in 840 in a summer tent on an island in the Rhine off Ingelheim
 The House of Ingelheim, among them Anselm Franz von Ingelheim, Archbishop of Mainz
 Jean-Baptiste Kléber, during the Siege of Mainz in 1793 headquartered in Ingelheim
 Eduard Douwes Dekker, known as Multatuli (2 March 1820 in Amsterdam – 19 February 1887 in Ingelheim am Rhein)
 Richard von Weizsäcker, from 1962 to 1966 managing partner of Boehringer Ingelheim
 Pope Joan, Johanna von Ingelheim, a perhaps real, perhaps fictitious figure

See also 
Universal Synod of Ingelheim

References

Further reading 
 Hans-Georg Meyer; Gerd Mentgen: Sie sind mitten unter uns: zur Geschichte der Juden in Ingelheim. Ingelheim 1998 
 Friedrich, Reinhard [Hrsg.]: Karl der Große in Ingelheim: Bauherr der Pfalz und europäischer Staatsmann; Katalog zur Ausstellung im Alten Rathaus Nieder-Ingelheim, 29. August bis 27. September 1998. Ingelheim 1998. 
 Landesamt für Vermessung und Geobasisinformation Rheinland-Pfalz: Ingelheim am Rhein. Topographische Karte 6014 (1:25.000).

Documents 
 picture of Oberingelheim from J.F. Dielmann, A. Fay, J. Becker (draughtsman): F.C. Vogels Panorama des Rheins, Bilder des rechten und linken Rheinufers, Lithographische Anstalt F.C. Vogel, Frankfurt 1833

External links 

 Town’s official webpage 
 Official Website of the Ingelheim Imperial Palace
 Deutsch-Israelischer Freundeskreis Ingelheim e.V. 
 The Stevenage-Ingelheim-Autun Association

 
Towns in Rhineland-Palatinate
Mainz-Bingen
Rhenish Hesse
Holocaust locations in Germany